Metropolitan Germogen, secular name Georgy Ivanovich Maximov, (10 January 1861 – 30 June 1945) was bishop of Aksay (9 May 1910 – 1919), Vicar of the Don Diocese, 23rd Bishop of Yekaterinoslav and Novomoskovsk (1919 – November 1920), Governor of the Russian Orthodox municipalities on Crete and North Africa with a seat in Athens (1922), Archbishop of Yekaterinoslav and Novomoskovsk (ROCOR, titular) (1922–1942), member of the Synod of Bishops of the Russian Orthodox Church Abroad (1924–1942), the head (Patriarch or Metropolitan) of the Croatian Orthodox Church (1942–1945).

Early life
Georgy Ivanovich Maximov was born in 1861 in Stanitsa Nogavskaya in the Don Host Oblast of the Russian Empire to a Cossack family. His father was a church reader (Russian: псаломщик). He finished elementary and parochial school in Nogavskaya and high school in Ust-Medvedicka. He studied from 1879 to 1882, in the Don Theological Seminary in Novocherkassk, and then attended the Spiritual Academy in Kiev.

After graduating from the Kiev Theological Academy in 1886, he served as a priest in Novocherkassk, where he remained for years. "He was an extremist in his religious beliefs. Before being tonsured as a monk in December 1890, he castrated himself with his own hands in an attempt to achieve moral perfection through mortification of the flesh." [from RASPUTIN: FAITH POWER AND THE TWILIGHT OF THE ROMANOVS by Douglas  Smith] Soon he became principal of the church gymnasium in Ust-Medvedicka in 1894. He left Don Episcopacy in 1902 for Vladikavkaz, where he became rector of the cathedral in Vladikavkaz.

After his wife's death, he was left with six children, the youngest was one year old and the eldest sixteen. By decision of the Holy Synod he was appointed Rector of the seminary in Saratov in 1906.

He became monk in August 1909, adopting the name ″Germogen″, and was elevated to the rank of archimandrite.

In May 1910, he was consecrated as Bishop of Aksay in Saint Petersburg, Vicar of the Don Diocese, and on 18 May, he arrived at the Don Diocese in Novocherkassk for his duties.

In 1919, he became 23rd Bishop of the Yekaterinoslav and Novomoskovsk (1919 – November 1920)

After the October Revolution in 1917, Germogen condemned Bolsheviks′ campaign against Cossacks in the course of the Russian Civil War. He was a participant of the Southern Church Council of the Russian Church that took place in Stavropol from 18 May to 24 May 1919, at which the Church Administration was formed in Southern Russia that adopted ecclesiastical authority in the territory held by the troops of Anton Denikin's White Army.

In the spring of 1920, he went from Novorossiysk to Yalta by boat (from whence the final evacuation of the White Guard troops took place in November 1920), then on to Constantinople and later to the city of Thessaloniki, Greece.

Russian Orthodox Church Outside Russia (ROCOR)
On 30 May 1922, by the decision of the Russian Church Administration Abroad, he was given charge of Russian Orthodox Christians in Greece, Cyprus, and Egypt. Later that year, he was elevated to the rank of Archbishop and appointed to a position in the U.S., but he declined to assume it citing illness; afterwards he resided in the Novo Hopovo monastery, Serbia, in retirement.

In 1924–1942, he was a member of the Synod of Bishops of the Russian Orthodox Church Abroad, which was based in Sremski Karlovci.

Croatian Orthodox Church

On 3 April 1942, the Ante Pavelić government of the Independent State of Croatia adopted a law that established the "Croatian Eastern Orthodox Church"

On 2 June 1942, Germogen was named primate of the Croatian Orthodox Church and enthroned at a ceremony presided over by Patriarch of All Romania Nicodim in the Church of the Holy Transfiguration in Zagreb on 7 June 1942 in presence of top officials of the Independent State of Croatia. 

He took the oath a day later. He was immediately condemned by the Russian Orthodox Church Abroad and expelled from its Synod. Patriarch Germogen was, along with other leaders of his organisation, decorated by Pavelić with the Order for Merits.

Execution
After Yugoslav Partisans captured Zagreb on 9 May 1945, the Croatian Orthodox Church was abolished, and Germogen was arrested. He, along with three priests of the Croatian Orthodox Church, was court-martialled on 29 June 1945 and shot the next day, at age 84.

Heritage and evaluation 
On 23 September 2010 the Synod of Bishops of the Russian True Orthodox Church (RIPC) held in the Church of Saint John of Kronstadt in Odessa (Ukraine), declared him a Christian E. Orthodox martyr. The RIPC is not in communion with any of the historical and canonical E. Orthodox Christian Churches. The Serbian Orthodox Church expressed outrage over this act. On 15 December 2010, the Synod of Bishops of the Russian True Orthodox Church issued an official document of the suspension of that Act: "The Synod regrets the hasty decision and requests forgiveness from the clergy and laity of the brotherly Serbian True Orthodox Church (SIPC) and hereby suspends the Act".

References
Notes

Bibliography

External links
 Vladimir Geiger, Smrtna presuda Vojnog suda Komande grada Zagreba poglavaru Hrvatske pravoslavne crkve u Nezavisnoj Državi Hrvatskoj mitropolitu Germogenu 1945. godine (Archived), Centar za politološka istraživanja  
 Miloš Obrknežević. Development Of Orthodoxy In Croatia And The Croatian Orthodox Church; accessed 4 August 2015.
 Association of Croatian Orthodox Believers; accessed 4 August 2015.

1861 births
1945 deaths
People from Kotelnikovsky District
People from Don Host Oblast
20th-century Eastern Orthodox bishops
Bishops of the Russian Orthodox Church Outside of Russia
Croatian Orthodox Church
Croatian bishops
Croatian collaborators with Nazi Germany
Eastern Orthodox clergy convicted of crimes
Eastern Orthodoxy and far-right politics
Executed people from Rostov Oblast
Yugoslav anti-communists
Kiev Theological Academy alumni
Executed Yugoslav collaborators with Nazi Germany
People killed by Yugoslav Partisans
Civilians who were court-martialed
People executed by Yugoslavia by firing squad